Fatou is a gorilla residing at Berlin Zoo, Germany.
Estimated to have been born in 1957 in the wild, she was brought from West Africa to France by a sailor in 1959, and then acquired by the Berlin Zoo. In 1974, she gave birth to the first gorilla to be raised in Berlin, Dufte.
She celebrated her 65th birthday on April 13, 2022. Since the death of Colo in January 2017, she has likely been the oldest living gorilla in the world (initially together with American gorilla Trudy, who died in July 2019).

Through her only offspring, Dufte, Fatou is a grandmother of two, great-grandmother of 13 (six living), and great-great-grandmother of 16 (ten living).

References

Individual gorillas
1957 animal births

Berlin Zoological Garden